Jeanette James (born 15 November 1946) is a Trinidadian former cricketer who played as an all-rounder. She appeared in four One Day Internationals for Trinidad and Tobago at the 1973 World Cup. She made her One Day International debut in a group stage match against Australia.

References

External links
 
 

1946 births
Living people
Trinidad and Tobago women cricketers
West Indian women cricketers